KQRZ-LP (100.7 FM) is a low-power radio station licensed to Hillsboro, Oregon, United States. The station is owned by the Oregon Amateur Radio Club, Inc. KQRZ-LP signed on the air July 22, 2012, on an initial frequency of 101.5 MHz.  On July 11, 2013, at 8:00 PM, KQRZ-LP changed the transmit frequency to 100.7 MHz, although the license to cover that frequency was not issued by the Federal Communications Commission until September 4, 2013.

On July 22, 2012, KQRZ undertook an affiliation with the WORC Oldies Network, which syndicates broadcast material to other low-power radio stations interested in amateur radio. Programming includes amateur (ham) radio news, educational material, comedy, oldies, and adult standard music.

KICN-LP (96.7 FM) is simulcasting KQRZ.

Veteran disc jockey (DJ) "The Vegetable Man", who was local to Pacific Northwest radio in the 1960s, is also broadcast by the network with periodic shows daily.

Fictional
The call letters of KQRZ were used for a fictional TV station in Los Angeles, California, in the Adam-12 television episode entitled Pick Up.

References

External links

QRZ-LP
QRZ-LP
Hillsboro, Oregon
2012 establishments in Oregon